This is an incomplete list of ghost towns in Michigan.

 Alcona
 Amble
 Antrim City
 Aral
 Atkinson
 Baltic
 Bass Lake
 Beitner
 Berringer Corners
 Berryville
 Bertrand
 Big Rock
 Bingham
 Bolton
 Bond's Mill
 Branch (in Branch County)
 Brookside
 Butternut
 Calvin Center
 Cambridge Junction
 Central
 Chestonia
 Cleon
 Clifton, also known as Cliff
 Colonville
 Copper Falls Mine
 Crawfords Quarry
 Crescent
 Crofton
 Damon
 Deward
 Dighton
 Duncan
 East Bay
 Eckford
 Emerson
 Eschol
 Essex
 Evans
 Fayette
 Federman
 Fiborn Quarry
 Fish Lake
 Fleming
 Frederick
 Geels
 Geloster
 Gibbs City
 Good Harbor
 Grafton
 Goo
 Hallock
 Hannah
 Hard Luck
 Harlan
 Havre
 Henry
 Herron
 Hodge
 Isadore
 Jacktown
 Jennings
 Kenneth
 Kensington
 Keystone
 Killmaster
 Leer
 Lupton
 Mabel
 Mandan
 Manseau
 Mansfield
 Marlborough
 Martins Landing
 Mentha
 Meredith
 Metz
 Milton
 Mitchell
 Monroe Center
 Mottville
 Neahtawanta
 Nessen City
 Nicholsville
 Nonesuch Mine
 North Unity
 Old Mission Point
 Omard
 Onominee
 Park Lake
 Peacock
 Pennock
 Pequaming
 Pere Cheney
 Pinnebog
 Pinnepog
 Podunk
 Pokagon
 Port Sheldon
 Potts (McKinley)
 Print (Griner Station)
 Quinn
 Rattle Run
 Rawsonville
 Sharon
 Shattuckville
 Shavehead
 Sheffield
 Shelldrake
 Shiawassee Town
 Sigma
 Singapore
 South Assyria
 South Boardman
 Springvale
 Star City
 Stittsville
 Stover
 Stratford
 Summit City
 Superior
 Temple
 Trowbridge
 Tunk
 Union
 Vermilion
 Volinia
 Walton
 Watervale
 Wekwagamaw
 Wetzell
 Whiskey Creek
 Whitefish Point
 Wilson

References

 
Michigan
Ghost towns